Sportclub Buitenveldert is a Dutch football (soccer) club from the neighborhood Buitenveldert in Amsterdam. It was founded in 1974. In 2020–21, the club has a women's team in Hoofdklasse and a men's team in the Derde Klasse. The women's team has in the past made it to the Topklasse.

References

Football clubs in the Netherlands
Football clubs in Amsterdam
1901 establishments in the Netherlands